"Kiss or Kiss" is the fifth single released by Japanese rock singer Nana Kitade. The single reached #11 on the Oricon Charts (being her highest-charting song to date) and stayed on the charts for a total of eight weeks. The song was used as the ending song for the drama Anego, starring Jin Akanishi.

An English version of the song is featured on the U.S. re-release of 18: Eighteen as a bonus track and on her seventh single, "Slave of Kiss".

Music video
The music video for "Kiss or Kiss" takes place in a messy living room and bathroom, where she is shown playing guitar. There are scenes interspersed of a small room where confetti falls all over her while she plays.

Track listing
 Kiss or Kiss - 3:57
  - 3:32
 Kiss or Kiss (Instrumental) - 3:57

Charts

2005 singles
Nana Kitade songs
Songs written by Nana Kitade
Japanese television drama theme songs
2005 songs